The Uibărești is a right tributary of the river Ribița in Romania. It flows into the Ribița near the village Uibărești.

References

Rivers of Romania
Rivers of Hunedoara County